La querida del Centauro, is a Spanish-language telenovela produced by Teleset and Sony Pictures Television for Telemundo.

Series overview

Episode list

Season 1 (2016)

Season 2 (2017)

References 

Lists of Mexican drama television series episodes
Lists of soap opera episodes